Duthoit is the name of several people:
Aimé Duthoit (1803–1869), French draughtsman, designer and sculptor, known with Louis as frères Duthoit
Éliane Duthoit (born 1946), French diplomat
Jack Duthoit (1918–2001), English professional footballer
Louis Duthoit (1807–1874), French draughtsman, designer and sculptor, known with Aimé as frères Duthoit